Since the 1968 Summer Olympics did not feature tennis as an official sport, two unofficial tournaments were held during the Games: a Demonstration tournament and an Exhibition tournament.

The Exhibition tournament was played from 24 to 26 October 1968 on the clay courts of the Chapultepec Sports Center in Mexico City, Mexico. All matches were played at best-of-three sets; since the tiebreak rule wasn't implemented until the 1970s, a team had to win a set by a two-game margin in case of a 6–6 draw. Due to the short length of the tournament, no third place match was played, and both semifinal losers received bronze medals.

Mexicans Rafael Osuna and Vicente Zarazúa won the title by defeating French Pierre Darmon and also Mexican Joaquín Loyo Mayo 6–4, 3–6, 14–12 in the final. Ecuatorian Pancho Guzmán and Soviet Teimuraz Kakulia, alongside also Soviets Vladimir Korotkov and Anatoli Volkov, have won bronze medals.

Seeds

Draw

References

External links
 Official Results Archive (ITF)

1968
Exhibition
Men's events at the 1968 Summer Olympics